The Maniac World Tour, officially Stray Kids 2nd World Tour "Maniac", is the ongoing second concert tour by South Korean boy band Stray Kids in support of their 2022 extended plays (EPs), Oddinary, Circus and Maxident, and 2023 album The Sound. The group traveled to several cities in Asia, North America, and Australia, beginning from April 29 to May 1, 2022, at Jamsil Arena, Seoul, South Korea, and concluding on April 2 at BMO Stadium, Los Angeles, the United States, comprising 42 shows. This is the group's first in-person concert tour in about two years since their first tour District 9: Unlock in 2019–2020.

Background and overview

Stray Kids held their first world tour, District 9: Unlock, in 2019–2020 with 24 shows across Asia, the United States, and Europe, but most shows were canceled or postponed due to the COVID-19 pandemic. On November 22, 2020, the group held their first online concert, titled Unlock: Go Live In Life via Beyond Live and was considered as a continuation of their District 9: Unlock. On February 13, 2022, Stray Kids announced their sixth EP Oddinary, scheduled for release on March 18. While teasing the EP, they announced their second world tour, titled Maniac. It is scheduled to begin on April 30 – May 1 in Seoul, South Korea, and travel to several cities in Japan and the United States, comprising 15 shows so far. Avenues and additional shows will be announced soon. The tour is named after the EP's lead single "Maniac".

On March 28, the group announced that the Seoul shows would be held at Jamsil Indoor Stadium, adding an additional date in Seoul on April 29, and the last day of the Seoul shows would be broadcast online via Beyond Live. On April 15, the venues in Japan were announced, holding at World Memorial Hall in Kobe, and Yoyogi National Stadium 1st Gymnasium in Tokyo. Additionally, the June 18, and July 27 shows were broadcast exclusively at several movie theaters in Japan through Live Viewing Japan on the same date as the concert, alongside airing as a pay-per-view livestream of June 12 and July 26 shows through several Japanese livestream services. The July 27 show was broadcast through Beyond Live outside Japan.

The US leg venues were announced on April 18. On April 23, two US shows were added: one in Newark, and one in Los Angeles, due to overwhelming demand. New three shows in the US: one in Seattle, and two in Anaheim, were additionally added on May 4. On July 3, JYP Entertainment announced that the members, Lee Know, Felix, and I.N, tested positive for COVID-19, resulting in the shows on July 3 and 6 having been postponed. On July 12, before the show began, Oakland Police Department announced through Twitter about awareness of threats concerning and additional police officers would be present at the event due to a series of tweets, showing threats to shoot and otherwise harm the group, were found, but later not appear to have been disrupted in the show. On July 14, JYP announced that Hyunjin injured his right hand minorly before the Oakland show and would therefore only be partially participating in the rest of the remaining tour.

On August 5, Stray Kids announced the two additional Seoul shows, titled Stray Kids 2nd World Tour "Maniac" Seoul Special (Unveil 11). It is scheduled for holding on September 17–18 at KSPO Dome. Songs of their upcoming EP Maxident–"3Racha", "Taste", "Can't Stop", "Circus" (Korean version)–were performed for the first time, alongside "Mixtape: Time Out", and the unreleased Korean version of "Fam" from their Japanese EP All In. On September 29, Stray Kids announced the additional eleven shows in 2023 in Indonesia, Thailand, Singapore, and Australia, including Atlanta and Fort Worth, which postponed from July. On October 4, they announced two additional Melbourne and Sydney shows due to popular demand. On November 4, they announced the two Manila shows, holding on March 11–12, 2023, and encore shows at Saitama and Osaka in February, and Los Angeles in April.

Concert synopsis

The concert began with the overture called "SKZ Anthem". After that, Stray Kids appeared on the stage in all-black outfits, adding spider web-like silver accessories to perform six songs: "Maniac", "Venom", "Red Lights", "Easy", "All In" (Korean version), and "District 9". "Red Lights", initially performed by Bang Chan and Hyunjin, was shown by whole members, using the black cloth hanging from the ceiling. The show continued with the group wearing student-like costumes to perform "Back Door", "Charmer", "B Me", "Lonely St.", and "Side Effects". In the second half of the concert, the members wore hanbok to perform "Thunderous", "Domino", and "God's Menu", and continued with "Cheese" and "Yayaya + Rock". All songs in this part were performed with live band. 

Following this, the group showcased the sub-unit songs from Oddinary. Bang Chan, Lee Know, Seungmin, and I.N performed "Waiting for Us", appearing in pastel outfits and stand microphone covered by flowers. Sang "Muddy Water", Changbin, Hyunjin, Han, and Felix are clad in black leather jackets. In the final part, the members in white tweed jackets performed "Silent Cry", "Hellevator", "Double Knot", "Top" and "Victory Song". For encore, the group appeared with t-shirts with the word "Maniac" on them. The first song to perform is different each day: "Astronaut" on day 1, "My Pace" on day 2, "Ta" on day 3, and followed by "Miroh", "Star Lost", and "Haven" before the show end.

Critical reception

Todd Inoue from the Datebook section of San Francisco Chronicle praised the concert in Oakland as "a glorious evening of reconnection and restoration," and compares the spider motif on the stage to the resemblance of David Bowie's 1987 Glass Spider Tour. Writing for NME, Daly Rhian gave five out of five stars for the first day of Anaheim shows, saying that the concert is "anything but ordinary". Crystal Bell from Teen Vogue called the performances "electrifying" and "relentlessly hype", describing how the group's presence "ignited entire arenas, no words needed". Writing for Sanook.com, Jurairat N. praised the concert as "the best K-pop show in Thailand in 2023 so far". The AU Reviews Anastasia Giggins gave four and half out of five stars for the show at Melbourne.

Set list
{{hidden|header=Set list in Seoul (April 29 – May 1, 2022)|content=Main set

 "Maniac"
 "Venom"
 "Red Lights" (8-member version)
 "Easy"
 "All In" (Korean version)
 "District 9"
 "Back Door"
 "Charmer"
 "B Me"
 "Lonely St."
 "Side Effects"
 "Thunderous"
 "Domino"
 "God's Menu"
 "Cheese"
 "Yayaya" + "Rock"
 "Waiting for Us"
 "Muddy Water"
 "Silent Cry"
 "Hellevator"
 "Double Knot"
 "Top"
 "Victory Song"
Encore
 "Astronaut" (April 29) / "My Pace" (April 30) / "Ta" (May 1)
 "Miroh"
 "Star Lost"
 "Haven"
Double encore
 "Boxer" (May 1)
|headercss=background: #ccccff; font-size: 100%; width: 75%;|contentcss=text-align: left; font-size: 100%; width: 75%;}}

{{hidden|header=Set list in Japan (June 11–19, July 26–27, 2022)|content=Main set

 "Maniac"
 "Venom"
 "Red Lights" (8-member version)
 "Easy"
 "All In"
 "District 9"
 "Back Door"
 "Charmer"
 "Lonely St."
 "Side Effects"
 "Thunderous"
 "Domino"
 "God's Menu"
 "Cheese"
 "Yayaya" + "Rock"
 "Waiting for Us"
 "Muddy Water"
 "Circus"
 "Scars"
 "Hellevator"
 "Top" (Japanese version)
 "Victory Song"
Encore
 "Fam"
 "Miroh"
 "Star Lost"
 "Haven"
|headercss=background: #ccccff; font-size: 100%; width: 75%;|contentcss=text-align: left; font-size: 100%; width: 75%;}}

{{hidden|header=Set list in the United States (June 28 – July 20, 2022)|content=Main set

 "Maniac"
 "Venom"
 "Red Lights" (8-member version)
 "Easy"
 "All In" (Korean version)
 "District 9"
 "Back Door"
 "Charmer"
 "Lonely St."
 "Side Effects"
 "Thunderous"
 "Domino"
 "God's Menu"
 "Cheese"
 "Yayaya" + "Rock"
 "Waiting for Us"
 "Muddy Water"
 "Scars" (Korean version)
 "Hellevator"
 "Top"
 "Victory Song"
Encore
 "Ta" (June 28–29) / "My Pace" (otherwise)
 "Miroh"
 "Star Lost"
 "Haven"
|headercss=background: #ccccff; font-size: 100%; width: 75%;|contentcss=text-align: left; font-size: 100%; width: 75%;}}

{{hidden|header=Set list in Seoul (September 17–18, 2022)|content=Main set

 "Maniac"
 "Venom"
 "Red Lights" (8-member version)
 "Easy"
 "All In" (Korean version)
 "District 9"
 "Back Door"
 "Charmer"
 "B Me"
 "Lonely St."
 "Side Effects"
 "Thunderous"
 "Domino"
 "God's Menu"
 "Cheese"
 "Yayaya" + "Rock"
 "3Racha"
 "Taste"
 "Can't Stop"
 "Mixtape: Time Out"
 "Circus" (Korean version)
 "Hellevator"
 "Top"
 "Victory Song"
Encore
 "Astronaut"
 "Airplane"
 "Miroh"
 "Fam" (Korean version)
 "Star Lost"
 "Haven"
|headercss=background: #ccccff; font-size: 100%; width: 75%;|contentcss=text-align: left; font-size: 100%; width: 75%;}}

{{hidden|header=Set list in Japan (February 11–12, 25–26, 2023)|content=Main set

 "Maniac"
 "Venom"
 "Red Lights" (8-member version)
 "Easy"
 "All In"
 "District 9"
 "Back Door"
 "Charmer"
 "Lonely St."
 "Side Effects"
 "Thunderous"
 "Domino"
 "God's Menu"
 "Cheese"
 "Yayaya" + "Rock"
 "Waiting for Us"
 "Muddy Water"
 "The Sound"
 "Case 143" (Japanese version)
 "Hellevator"
 "Top" (Japanese version)
 "Victory Song"
Encore (February 11–12)
 "Fairytale"
 "Blueprint"
 "Miroh"
 "Fam"
 "Star Lost"
 "Haven"
Encore (February 25–26)
 "Mixtape: Time Out"
 "Fairytale"
 "Circus"
 "Super Board"
 "Fam"
 "Star Lost"
 "Haven"
 "Miroh" (February 26 only)
|headercss=background: #ccccff; font-size: 100%; width: 75%;|contentcss=text-align: left; font-size: 100%; width: 75%;}}

Shows

Personnel 

Stray Kids
 Bang Chan
 Lee Know
 Changbin
 Hyunjin
 Han
 Felix
 Seungmin
 I.N

Band
 Bang In-jae – guitarist
 Kim Seung-ho – drummer
 Ku Bon-am – bassist
 Moon Sang-soon – keyboardist

Notes

References

External links
  

2022 concert tours
2023 concert tours
Beyond Live
Concert tours of Australia
Concert tours of Indonesia
Concert tours of Japan
Concert tours of Singapore
Concert tours of South Korea
Concert tours of Thailand
Concert tours of the United States